World Eater is the third studio album by British musician Benjamin John Power, under his musical project Blanck Mass. It was released on 3 March 2017 by Sacred Bones Records.

Production
World Eater was recorded in Power's home studio in Tranent, Scotland.

Artwork
The album's artwork shows a close up picture of an animal's bare teeth, to which Power explained: "Fear and hope are both parts of our human make up, but it's the way that we act upon these feelings that is of concern to me – to understand the beast or to become the beast."

Release
On 10 January 2017, Blanck Mass announced the release of his third studio album World Eater. In a statement of the release, Power explained: 
"The title is a reference to both the inner beast inside human beings that when grouped en-masse stops us from moving forward towards good. Being surrounded by so much hate in the world right now throws a whole new light on the importance of love. I have never set out to make a protest record. I’ve never set out to make any kind of record really, but during the creative process for this and any of my past releases I start to form a bond with the project as we grow together."

Singles
The first single "Please" was released on 10 January 2017, the same day as the album release announcement. The Line of Best Fit described "Please" as being "jammed with mayhem and bursting with tormented vocal shards."

On 2 February 2017, the second single "Silent Treatment" was released. Describing the single, Powers said: ""Silent Treatment" is about the problems that arise when we don't communicate. We often grow apart when we don't understand each other. Being left in the dark can lead to fear." Pitchfork described the single as "jagged shards of euphoric instrumentals, piles on samples of disembodied vocals, and ratchets up the tempo until the song's intensity reaches an uncomfortable extreme. At its peak, the song evokes the feeling of a dance floor freak-out." Stereogum described "Silent Treatment" as a "beast of a track that's both beautiful and punishing, building choral samples and sheets of static into an overwhelming, transcendent experience."

Music videos
The official music video for "Please" was released on Power's Facebook and YouTube on 16 February 2017. The animated video was created by Michael Tan.

On 19 July 2017, the second music video "The Rat" was released, and shows Power riding on a theme park attraction for majority of the video. In a press release, Power spoke of the video: "The video itself is a bit of fun and was filmed on a family vacation, but somehow I feel it represents discontent within a capitalist regime and a world full of sugar-coated shit."

Tour
In support of the album, Power went on tour of Europe and the UK, starting on 31 March 2017 at the Rewire Festival in Netherlands, and finishing up at The Lantern in Bristol, London on 29 April 2017.

Critical reception
World Eater was met with "universal acclaim" reviews from critics. At Metacritic, which assigns a weighted average rating out of 100 to reviews from mainstream publications, this release received an average score of 81 based on 23 reviews. Aggregate website AnyDecentMusic? gave the release a 7.6 out of 10 based on a critical consensus of 23 reviews.

In a review for AllMusic, critic reviewer Heather Phares wrote: "Benjamin John Power transforms furious noise, drones, and the surprisingly danceable elements of Dumb Flesh into vivid portraits of division and turmoil that sound big enough to engulf a planet and intricate enough to consume it from within. World Eater's focused chaos is some of his finest work yet." At Exclaim!, Tom Beedham said: "Power's music has consistently found space for stark, cathartic purges, but World Eater matches its brutal releases with hope and luminosity. It's a radical, adventurous exploration — and celebration — of the relationship between darkness and light." Robert Ham of Paste stated: "The mixture of gentility and dissonance is somehow more unsettling than if Power was to go full on into harsher, angrier territory. The balance that he maintains throughout is what makes the album work."

Accolades

Track listing

References

External links
 
 
 World Eater at Sacred Bones Records

2017 albums
Blanck Mass albums
Sacred Bones Records albums